Freeway 6 is a freeway in central and western Iran located in Markazi and  Hamedan Provinces. The freeway was completely opened in winter (February) 2016. There are plans to expand the freeway towards Kermanshah and Khosravi near the Iraqi border and join Highway 5. The freeway runs parallel to Road 48.

Karbala freeway 
Karbala freeway Company was founded in 2007. Mr. Amin Choubdar, is an Iranian business executive. He is an engineer and the chief executive officer (CEO) of Karbala freeway Co. .

References

Freeways in Iran
Transportation in Hamadan Province
Transportation in Markazi Province